The Allard-Latour was a car made by M. Allard-Latour of Lyon, France. Belt or chain driven, small numbers were made, from 1899 to 1902. Most if not all were sold in the Lyons area.

References

Defunct motor vehicle manufacturers of France
Vintage vehicles
Manufacturing companies based in Lyon